"Clout Cobain" (stylized CLOUT COBAIN | CLOUT CO13A1N) is a song by American rapper Denzel Curry released on July 12, 2018 as the third single from his third studio album, Ta13oo. Written by Curry alongside producers J Gramm and Mike Hector, the song lyrically is about his struggles with fame. It also makes several references to Kurt Cobain, the lead singer of American rock band, Nirvana, who committed suicide at the age of 27. The Zev Deans-directed official music video was released on Curry's Vevo channel the same day as the single, and has since been viewed more than 100 million times, becoming his most watched video.

Music video
The music video, released at the same time as the song, features Curry as a clown controlled by his master. The clown later commits suicide, causing the audience to boo the performance. The video received acclaim from critics. The video for Curry's follow up single, "Vengeance", can be seen as a sequel to this, while the video for Curry's other single, "Black Balloons", can be seen as a prequel to it.

Charts

Certifications

References 

2018 singles
2018 songs
Denzel Curry songs
Emo rap songs
Loma Vista Recordings singles